American Hostage is a scripted psychological thriller podcast starring Jon Hamm, Joseph Perrino, Carla Gugino, and Dylan Baker. It was produced by Criminal Content and released on February 22, 2022 by Amazon Music and Wondery. On March 8, 2022, it debuted at #7 on Apple Podcasts United States.

Background 
It is a dramatization of the true incident of Tony Kiritsis, who took his mortgage broker hostage in 1977. The crisis took place over three days.

References 

Crime podcasts
American podcasts
Scripted podcasts
Audio podcasts
History podcasts
Historical fiction podcasts
American radio dramas
2022 podcast debuts
Thriller podcasts